Joseph Boucher de Niverville (September 22, 1715 – August 30, 1804) was an army and militia officer in New France (under the rule of the Kingdom of France) and the Province of Quebec (under the rule of Great Britain) of present-day Canada. He was made a Chevalier of the Order of Saint Louis and his military career was "one of the longest of any Canadian officer in the 18th century."

In 1759, Marie, a Cree woman enslaved by Boucher de Niverville, injured his wife, Marie-Josephte Chastelain, and his mother, Marguerite, with a knife. In December of that year Marie was executed by hanging.

References

External links
 Manoir Boucher de Niverville

1715 births
1804 deaths
People from Chambly, Quebec
People of King George's War
French Canadian people of the French and Indian War
Canadian military personnel from Quebec
Knights of the Order of Saint Louis
Canadian slave owners